Francesca M. Kerton is a green chemist and Professor of Chemistry at Memorial University of Newfoundland, Canada.

Early life 
Kerton completed her B.Sc. (Hons) in chemistry with environmental science at the University of Kent. She then completed her D.Phil. (1995–1999) at the University of Sussex.

Academic career 
Following a postdoctoral fellowship at the University of British Columbia (1999–2000), Kerton was appointed as a junior lecturer at the University of York (2000–2002). She was awarded a Royal Society (UK) University Research Fellowship (2002–2004). She was appointed as an assistant professor in the Department of Chemistry at the Memorial University of Newfoundland in 2005, where she founded the Green Chemistry and Catalysis Group. She was promoted to associate professor in 2010 and promoted to professor in 2015.

Research 
Kerton has authored more than 80 scientific papers related to green chemistry, organometallic chemistry, catalysis, and polymer chemistry. Kerton and her research group have contributed to the development of processes to convert waste from fish and shellfish processing plants into chemical feedstocks. Her laboratory has also developed polymerization catalysts using earth-abundant metals.

Published work 
Kerton is the co-author of the book Alternative Solvents for Green Chemistry, which is published by the Royal Society for Chemistry. She has also authored Fuels, Chemicals and Materials from the Oceans and Aquatic Sources, which is published by Wiley.

Honours and awards 
Kerton received the 2016 Dean's Distinguished Scholar Medal at Memorial University. In 2019, Kerton was recognized for her research with the Canadian Green Chemistry and Engineering Award (Individual). She was made a Fellow of the Royal Society of Chemistry in 2016.

Other contributions 
Kerton has served on the interdisciplinary adjudication committee for Canada Research Chairs program and as an evaluator of Fellowship proposals for the Association of Commonwealth Universities Blue Charter. She is an associate editor of the journal RSC Sustainability and a member of the editorial advisory board for the journal Reaction Chemistry and Engineering both published by the Royal Society of Chemistry. She is a member of the IUPAC committee for Chemistry Research Applied to World Needs (CHEMRAWN) and Chair of this committee since January 2020. She is the co-chair for the 27th Annual Green Chemistry and Engineering Conference in 2023.

References

External links 
Research Group Website
Interview with Green Chemistry blog

Living people
Academic staff of the Memorial University of Newfoundland
Year of birth missing (living people)
Fellows of the Royal Society of Chemistry
Women chemists